Erin N. Marcus, M.D., M.P.H is an internal medicine doctor who writes on public health and health disparity issues for The Washington Post, The Atlantic, The New York Times and other publications.

Career 
Marcus is a general internist and a professor of clinical medicine at the  University of Miami's Miller School of Medicine. Much of her non-academic writing focuses on how different public policies affect the diverse patients she sees as a primary care physician in Miami.

Marcus is a former American Association for the Advancement of Science Mass Media Fellow and worked as a newspaper reporter before receiving her medical degree. I

Selected academic publications
 Marcus, EN, Yepes, M, Dietz, N. Perception of Breast Density Information Among Women in Miami, FL: a Qualitative Study. Journal of Cancer Education 2020. , 1–8. DOI: 10.1007/s13187-020-01778-2. Online First: http://link.springer.com/article/10.1007/s13187-020-01778-2.
 Allespach H, Marcus EN, Bosire KM. Sailing on the ‘7 Cs’: teaching junior doctors how to redirect patients during difficult consultations in primary care. Education for Primary Care. 2018 Jan. 29:1. 46–48. DOI: 10.1080/14739879.2017.1312554. 
 Allespach, H., Marcus, EN. The Rule of Six 2s’: teaching learners simple strategies for structuring an outpatient adult primary care follow-up visit in the 21st century. Postgraduate Medical Journal 2016 August. 629–630. Doi: 10.1136/postgradmedj-2016-134175. PMID 27555607.
 Marcus, EN, Yepes M. "Not just a radiologic term: The conundrum of explaining breast density to patients." Cleveland Clinic Journal of Medicine, 12(2013): 761–765. PMID 24307159.  
 Marcus, E. N. (2006). The silent epidemic—the health effects of illiteracy. New England Journal of Medicine, 355(4), 339–341.
 Tamariz, Leonardo, Ana Palacio, Mauricio Robert, and Erin N. Marcus. "Improving the informed consent process for research subjects with low literacy: a systematic review." Journal of General Internal Medicine 28, no. 1 (2013): 121–126.
 Marcus, E. N. (2016). Muslim Women's Preferences in the Medical Setting: How Might They Contribute to Disparities in Health Outcomes?. Journal of Women's Health, 25(6), 561–562.

Honors and awards
In 2009 she was awarded an American Cancer Society Cancer Control Career Development Award for Primary Care Physicians and a grant from the Ford Foundation. In 2013, she was named one of ten internists that physicians should follow on Twitter by Medical Economics.

References

External links

 University of Miami profile

Living people
American women physicians
Physicians from Florida
American health and wellness writers
University of Miami faculty
American women non-fiction writers
Year of birth missing (living people)
American women academics
21st-century American women